The Human Race is an American science fiction action thriller film directed and written by Paul Hough. It stars Paul McCarthy-Boyington, Eddie McGee and Trista Robinson as a group of people who find themselves forced to race or die. A work-in-progress copy was screened at the 2012 Fantasia Film Festival and the finished copy had its world premiere on April 11, 2013 at the Brussels International Fantastic Film Festival.

Synopsis 
Eighty people are horrified to wake in a strange institutional setting, with the only common factors between them the knowledge that prior to their abductions they witnessed a sudden flash of white light, and that they were all on a certain block in Los Angeles. Each of the eighty hears his or her own voice in their heads, stating that they are all participants in a race which only one can survive. Rules: all must participate, all must stay on the paths and off the grass, and anyone who is lapped twice will die. Many die almost instantly; others are killed or forced to their deaths by other racers. As the numbers thin, counting off inside their heads, the survivors become more and more desperate to stay alive.

Cast 
 Paul McCarthy-Boyington as Justin
 Eddie McGee as Eddie
 Trista Robinson as Deaf Female
 T. Arthur Cottam as Deaf Male
 Brianna Lauren Jackson as Veronica
 Fred Coury as Yellow Jersey
 B. Anthony Cohen as The Priest
 Noel Britton as Stressed Out
 J. Louis Reid as War Vet
 Celine Tien as Ting
 Ian Tien as Shio Lau
 Richard Gale as Evil Brother
 Shawne Coyne as Mohawk
 Luke Y. Thompson as Orange Vest
 Jonica Patella as Homeless
 Trip Hope as Jim Phillips (as A.K. Walker)

Reception
Variety wrote that "Although haphazardly assembled, Paul Hough's low-budget survival thriller is not without intrigue", while the Los Angeles Times called it an "eerie, violent sci-fi survival tale". Twitch Film commented that "while the film never quite transcends the genre in the ways that it could have, it's still an exciting, well-acted and extremely bloody slice of survivalist action with some nice surprises up its sleeve".

Review aggregator Rotten Tomatoes found that 42% of 12 critical reviews were positive, with an average rating of 2.4/10.

References

External links 
 
 The Human Race at Horror-Movies

2013 films
2010s English-language films
Films directed by Paul Hough
2013 action thriller films
2013 science fiction action films
American action thriller films
American science fiction action films
Films about death games
Alien abduction films
2010s American films